Ajina Station (阿品駅) is a railway station on the Sanyō Main Line in Hatsukaichi, Hiroshima, operated by West Japan Railway Company (JR West).

Platforms

Connecting lines

JR
█ Sanyō Main Line
Rapid Service
non-stop
Local
Miyauchikushido Station — Ajina Station — Miyajimaguchi Station

Hiroden
█ Miyajima Line
Line #2
Ajina-higashi — Hiroden-ajina — Hiroden-miyajima-guchi
JR Ajina Station is directly connected to Hiroden-ajina Station by the overpass.

History
Opened on 11 August 1989.

See also

 List of railway stations in Japan

References

External links

  

Sanyō Main Line
Hiroshima City Network